Real Club Náutico de La Coruña (Royal Corunna Yacht Club) is a yacht club located in Corunna, Galicia (Spain).

It was established in 1926, and the club's sailing school was created in 1968. Both facilities are located at downtown Corunna.

Races and fleets
The club hosted the 2000 Optimist World Championship and the 2017 Snipe World Championship.

Notable members
Sofía Toro, gold medallist at the 2012 Summer Olympics in Elliott 6m class.
Roberto Bermúdez de Castro, 2014–15 Volvo Ocean Race winner with Azzam.

References

External links
Official website

 
1926 establishments in Spain